Kara Arslan Ahmad Qavurt (died 1073), better simply known as Qavurt (also spelled Kavurt) was a Seljuq prince. Upon his brother's death, he led an unsuccessful rebellion against his nephew in an attempt to gain the Seljuk throne.

Background 

The Seljuq dynasty was a Turkish Sunni Muslim dynasty that established both the Seljuq Empire and Sultanate of Rum, which at their total height stretched from Anatolia through Persia. Qavurt was the son of Çağrı Bey, who was the grandson of Seljuk, the founder of the dynasty. Qavurt's brother Alp Arslan succeeded his uncle Tuğrul as the new sultan and Qavurt then the governor of Kirman (south Persia) waited for his turn.

Alp Arslan's will 

Alp Arslan died in 1072. But before death he willed his throne to Malik Shah I, his second son. He also expressed his concern about possible throne struggles. The main contestants for the throne were his eldest son Ayaz and his brother Qavurt. As a  compromise, he willed generous grants to Ayaz and Qavurt. He also willed Qavurt to marry his widow.

Qavurt's rebellion

Malik Shah was only 17 or 18 years of age when he ascended to throne. Although Ayaz presented no problem, he faced with the serious problem of Qavurt's rebellion. His vizier Nizam al-Mulk was even more worried for he had become the de facto ruler of the empire during young Malik Shah's reign. Although Qavurt had only a small army, Turkmen officiers in Malik Shah's army tended to support Qavurt. So Malik Shah and Nizam al-Mulk added non Turkic regiments to Seljuk army. Artukids also supported Malik Shah.  The clash was at a location known as Kerç kapı (or Kerec ) close to Hamedan on 16 May 1073.  Malik Shah was able to defeat Qavurt's forces. Although Qavurt escaped, he was soon arrested. Initially Malik Shah was tolerant to his uncle. But Nizam al-Mulk convinced the young sultan to execute Qavurt. Nizam al-Mulk also executed two of Qavurt's four sons. Later he eliminated most of the Turkic commanders of the army whom he suspected to be Qavurt's partisans.

Aftermath

Qavurt's defeat was a blow to Turkic character of the empire. But Qavurt's other sons managed to rule in Kirman as vassals of Malik Shah and their small state lived even longer than that of the Great Seljuk Empire.

References 

1073 deaths
Seljuk dynasty
Turkic rulers
Year of birth unknown
Executed Turkish people
11th-century Turkic people